The first Iranian legislative election held in July 1906 after Iranian Constitutional Revolution by a sentence from Mozaffar ad-Din Shah Qajar.

References

1906 in Iran
National Consultative Assembly elections
1st term of the Iranian Majlis
1906 elections in Asia
Politics of Qajar Iran